Parma Calcio 1913 is an Italian football club based in Emilia-Romagna. The club was founded in 1913 (as Verdi F.B.C.) and has competed in the Italian football league system since 1919. Their first involvement in European competition – run by UEFA, the chief authority for football across Europe – was in 1991, entering the UEFA Cup. Since then, the club has competed in every UEFA-organised competition, with the exception of the now-defunct Intertoto Cup. The competition in which the club has had the most success is the UEFA Cup (now known as the UEFA Europa League); they have won two UEFA Cups, the first of which came in 1995 and the second in 1999. The club has also won the Cup Winners' Cup, which they won in 1993; and the Super Cup, also won in 1993.

European club competition

The first continental competition organised by UEFA was the European Cup in 1955. It is the most prestigious European football competition and was conceived by Gabriel Hanot, the editor of L'Équipe, as a competition for winners of the European national football leagues. It was re-branded as the Champions league in 1992. The UEFA Cup Winners' Cup was inaugurated in 1960; it was for the winners of domestic cup competitions, but was discontinued in 1999. The Inter-Cities Fairs Cup was established in 1955. This was later the UEFA Cup when it came under the auspices of UEFA in 1971. It featured teams that had failed to qualify for the Cup Winners' Cup or European Cup. It took on domestic cup winners in 1999 when the Cup Winners' Cup became defunct. In 2009, it was renamed, becoming the Europa League. The European Super Cup was created in 1972 by Anton Witkamp, a reporter and later sports editor of Dutch newspaper De Telegraaf, but was only recognised by UEFA the following year. The UEFA Intertoto Cup was run by UEFA from 1995 and primarily served as a preliminary tournament for the UEFA Cup, but it was discontinued in 2008.

History

Debut and successive finals (1991–1994)
Parma's debut European appearance came in 1991 after an impressive sixth place in their first season in Italy's top-flight after promotion the previous season, following AC Milan disqualifying in the famous night of the lights in Marseille. The club's first European tie was against CSKA Sofia, but it ended in disappointment and an away goals rule defeat. Disappointment turned to joy in the following season as the club lifted the Cup Winners' Cup, fired on by the goals of Faustino Asprilla and Alessandro Melli and negotiating ties against Újpest and Boavista before the Christmas break and Sparta Prague and Atlético Madrid in quarter-final and semi-final ties after it. The final at Wembley Stadium saw Parma faced with Belgian opponents Royal Antwerp, who were beaten 3–1 with the Italians' goals coming from Lorenzo Minotti, Melli and Stefano Cuoghi.

Parma won the European Super Cup a few months later, beating 1992 Champions League winners Milan over two legs. The club then re-entered the Cup Winners' Cup the following year as holders, having failed to retain the Coppa Italia. Degerfors were easily beaten in the first round, but penalties were needed to see Maccabi Haifa off in the following round. Keenly-contested ties against Ajax and Benfica saw Parma through to a second consecutive final. However, the result did not go the Ducali's way in their first test against English opposition. Hosted at the Parken Stadium in Copenhagen, Alan Smith's goal for Arsenal halfway through the first half was enough to secure victory.

UEFA Cup triumphs and the Champions League (1994–1999)
Parma incredibly managed a third consecutive European final appearance in 1995. This time the UEFA Cup was the target, and it was attacked with early victories over Vitesse Arnhem in a tight tie and AIK in more comfortable fashion. Close-run duels with Athletic Bilbao and Odense BK booked Parma a place in the semi-finals, where Bayer Leverkusen waited and were soundly beaten 5–1 on aggregate. The final was a two-legged affair against Juventus and Parma ran out 2–1 winners with ex-Juventus player Dino Baggio getting the winner. Non-descript campaigns in the Cup Winners' Cup and UEFA Cup followed as Parma were knocked out by Paris Saint-Germain in the quarter-finals and embarrassingly by Vitória de Guimarães in the first round, respectively.

An excellent finish in Serie A the summer of 1997 meant a first Champions League for Parma after Widzew Łódź were thumped in the qualifying round. Parma trailed only Borussia Dortmund in their group, but, with just two spaces up for grabs for the best second-placed teams, Parma's points tally was not quite enough to see them through in their only appearance in the Champions League group stages to date. The following year, 1999, was perhaps Parma's finest hour as a second UEFA Cup triumph was claimed. Difficult and close-run challenges against Fenerbahçe, Wisła Kraków and Rangers were overcome before Bordeaux were seen off with ease in the quarter-finals by seven goals to one, including a 6–0 thrashing in the return leg at home. Parma's place in the final never looked in doubt as they cruised past Atlético Madrid 5–2. The final was also a relatively comfortable affair. Marseille were soundly beaten by three goals to nil in the Luzhniki Stadium in Moscow to see Parma claim a fourth and final European trophy.

Failure to re-create former glory (1999–2007)
Failure to qualify from the qualifying round of the Champions League in the Augusts of 1999 and 2001 after defeat from Rangers and Lille, respectively. On both occasions the club dropped into the UEFA Cup and fell at the Round of 16 stage. They also did so when they qualified directly for the competition in 2000–01 at the hands of PSV Eindhoven. Even less successful UEFA Cup campaigns followed as Parma were knocked out before Christmas at the hands of Wisła Kraków and Gençlerbirliği in 2002 and 2003.

 
Despite an alarming dip in domestic form in the 2004–05 season, which was in no small part down to the financial and criminal troubles of the club's owners, Parma managed a creditable semi-final appearance in the UEFA Cup, where they were knocked out by eventual winners CSKA Moscow. The following year was the club's first absence from European competition after a staggering and unparalleled streak of fourteen years was ended by a poor league finish. To date the most recent appearance in Europe came the following season as Parma profited from Calciopoli to gain a UEFA Cup berth, where they were eliminated by Braga in the Round of 32.

An unsuccessful return to Europe (2007–2015)
The club has not competed in European competition since 2007.

After qualification for Europe on the final day of the 2013–14 Serie A season, Parma were set to compete in the 2014–15 UEFA Europa League, but were denied a UEFA licence and therefore entry into the competition as a result of late payment of roughly €300,000 of tax.

Overall record

By competition

By country

UEFA coefficient history
In European football, UEFA coefficients are used to rank and seed teams in club competitions. The coefficients are calculated by UEFA, who administer football within Europe. Teams are only ranked if they have competed in European competition in the last five years, so Parma's first five-year ranking coefficient was calculated in 1992 at the end Parma's first European adventure. Conversely, a failure to qualify for European competition between 2006 and 2011 saw Parma lose its ranking. Parma's rank and coefficient over the years:

Footnotes

References

External links
 UEFA's Parma mini-site
 

Italian football clubs in international competitions
Europe